Sa Re Ga Ma Pa L'il Champs 2011 was the fifth season of the popular Indian Zee TV show Sa Re Ga Ma Pa L'il Champs. Broadcast from 3 June 2011, the music reality show had 18 participants: 9 boys and 9 girls. The theme for season 5 was Music Ka Gurukul. The show was won by Azmat Hussain, who later became a contestant on season 11 of Indian Idol.  The runner-up was Salman Ali who later on became the winner of season 10 of Indian Idol.

Host 
 Jay Soni

Teams
The candidates were divided into three teams, each guided by one of the judges. Zee Saregama Grand finale Live Telecast from Surat Event management by Atul Patel and Ashvin Borad, Modern Moviee Pvt Ltd -Surat work under the Reliance Production, Mumbai. Guest Shahrukh khan -Film Promotion -Ra One

Adnan ke Anokhe
Guru: Adnan Sami
 Barnali Hota (11, Bhubaneswar, Orissa) - eliminated 2 September
 Emil Roy (12, Nagpur, Maharashtra) - eliminated 25 June
 Niladri Chatterjee (10, Kolkata, West Bengal) - eliminated 23 September
 Sargamkant Vaish (11, Allahabad, Uttar Pradesh) - eliminated 2 July
 Simran Kaur (13, Haryana) - eliminated 25 June
 Srashti Singh(11, Haryana) - eliminated on 16 July

Kailash ke Avdhoo
Guru: Kailash Kher
 Anmol Khatri (11, Allahabad, Uttar Pradesh) - eliminated 26 August
 Pooja Tiwari (11, Lucknow, Uttar Pradesh) - eliminated 18 June
 Prajwal Shirke (10, Gwalior, Madhya Pradesh) - eliminated 18 June
 Rima Chakraborty (13, Berhampore, Murshidabad, West Bengal) - eliminated 9 July
 Salman Ali (13, Punahana, Mewat, Haryana) - grand finale contestant: second place
 Sanjana Bhola ... (12, Ludhiana, Punjab) - eliminated 19 August

Javed ke Abhiru
Guru: Javed Ali
 Azmat Hussain (10, Jaipur, Rajasthan) - eliminated 9 July, came back as wild card entry on 22 July and was crowned winner in the grand finale
 Krishnendu Adhikary (12, Shantipur, Nadia, West Bengal) - eliminated 16 July
 Nitin Kumar (14, Mubarikpur) - saved from elimination 9 September and 3rd place in grand finale
 Priyanshi Srivastava (9, Lucknow, Uttar Pradesh) - eliminated 2 July wildcard entry on 22 July and got eliminated again on 5 August
 Rimsha Deb (10, Dharmanagar, Tripura) - eliminated 16 September
 Veda Nerurkar (13, Mumbai, Maharashtra) - eliminated on 30 July

After the children were put into the three groups, the three judges put two contestants in the challenge round from their groups (1 boy and 1 girl). After that the one boy and one girl from each group sang and Alka Yagnik choose the two eliminated contestants out of the six total,

Week 1 Challenge round contestants: Top 18
Rimsa, Azmat, Emil, Shristy, Pooja, Prajwal (eliminated contestants: Prajwal and Pooja)

Week 2 Challenge round contestants: Top 16
Krishnendu, Emil, Simran, Veda, Reema, Salman (eliminated contestants: Emil and Simran)

Week 3 Challenge round contestants: Top 14
Sargam, Priyanshi, Krishnendu, Shristy, Salman, Sanjana (eliminated contestants: Sargam and Priyanshi)

Week 4 Challenge round contestants: Top 12
Azmat, Veda, Nirladri, Bernali, Salman, Reema (eliminated contestants: Reema and Azmat)

Week 5 Challenge round contestants: Top 10
Veda, Krishnendu, Nirladri, Shristy, Anmol, Sanjana (eliminated contestants: Krishnendu and Sristy)

The top eight and two wildcard contestants, Azmat and Priyanshi, formed the Dabanng dus. The voting system was used afterwards for selecting the finalist among Dabanng dus.

Top 10: Dabanng dus
 Barnali Hota - eliminated 2 September
 Niladri Chatterjee - eliminated 23 September
 Anmol Khatri - eliminated 26 August
 Salman Ali
 Sanjana Bhola - eliminated 19 August
 Priyanshi Srivastava - eliminated 5 August
 Rimsha Deb - eliminated 16 September
 Nitin Kumar
 Veda Nerurkar - eliminated 29 July
 Azmat Hussain

Top 10
 Bottom 3: Niladri, Veda, Priyanshi
 Bottom 2: Niladri, Veda
 Eliminated: Veda
Top 9
 Bottom 3: Anmol, Sanjana, Priyanshi
 Bottom 2: Sanjana, Priyanshi
 Eliminated: Priyanshi
Top 8
 Bottom 3: Nitin, Niladri, Sanjana
 Bottom 2: Niladri, Sanjana
 Eliminated: Sanjana
Top 7
 Bottom 2: Anmol, Niladri.
 Eliminated: Anmol
Top 6
 Bottom 2: Barnali, Nitin
 Eliminated: Barnali
Top 5
 Bottom 2: Nitin, Niladri
 Eliminated: Nitin (saved by Alka Yagnik's trump card)
Top 5
 Bottom 2: Niladri, Rimsha
 Eliminated: Rimsha
Top 4
 Bottom 2: Nitin, Niladri
 Eliminated: Niladri

Top 3
 Second runner up : Nitin Kumar
 First runner up: Salman Ali
 Winner: Azmat Hussain

References

Sa Re Ga Ma Pa
2011 Indian television seasons